The Jade University of Applied Sciences is a public university in Lower Saxony, Germany. It was founded in 2009 as a successor to the Fachhochschule Oldenburg/Ostfriesland/Wilhelmshaven. The university has campuses in Wilhelmshaven, Oldenburg and Elsfleth and around 6,700 students.

The university is named after the Jade river.

Notable alumni
 Matthias Groote, politician, member of the European parliament.
 Carola Rackete, captain and activist.
 Olaf Lies, politician, multiple times Minister of Lower Saxony.

References

External links
 Official Website of the University

Wilhelmshaven
2009 establishments in Germany
Universities and colleges in Lower Saxony
Universities of Applied Sciences in Germany
Oldenburg Land